Operation Thunder Child is a 1999 novel by British civil servant Nick Pope. Since Pope had worked for the British Ministry of Defence on the subject of unidentified flying objects, the book had to be cleared by the Ministry prior to publication.

A sequel, Operation Lightning Strike, was published in 2000.

Plot summary

The novel deals with UFOs and alien abductions, illustrating how the government and military cope with an increasingly intrusive and hostile alien presence. It draws on government work on UFOs and is a "what if" novel that reflects some of the author's concerns about the defence and national security issues raised by the UFO phenomenon. The book is a techno-thriller that draws on real crisis-management procedures.

Critical reception

The book received mixed reviews, with reviewers both describing it as an "excellent read" and describing the political content of the books as confusing and close to ranting, while other reviewers question the scientific plausibility of aspects of the novel.

Sequel

In Operation Lightning Strike, the limited battles in the previous book give way to all-out war, with the fate of Earth hanging in the balance. As with Operation Thunder Child, the book needed official clearance. This is unusual in fiction.

References

External links
Nick Pope's Homepage
Nick Popes Concept for the book
Nick Pope FAQ on the publishing of his books

1999 British novels
British science fiction novels
1999 science fiction novels